Des Tobin (born 19 November 1938) is a former  Australian rules footballer who played with North Melbourne in the Victorian Football League (VFL).

See also
 Australian football at the 1956 Summer Olympics

Notes

External links 

Living people
1938 births
Australian rules footballers from Victoria (Australia)
North Melbourne Football Club players